Violeta Luna (born February 24, 1943 in Guayaquil)  is an Ecuadorian poet, essayist, professor and literary critic.

Awards
 Award "A los mejores cuentos", 1969.
 Poetry National Award "Ismael Pérez Pazmiño", Diario El Universo, Guayaquil, 1970.
 National Award "Jorge Carrera Andrade", Quito, 1994.

Published works

Poetry:

 Poesía universitaria (Quito, 1964)
 El ventanal del agua (Quito, 1965)
 Y con el sol me cubro (Quito, 1967)
 Posiblemente el aire (Quito, 1970)
 Ayer me llamaba primavera (Quito, 1973)
 La sortija de la lluvia (Guayaquil, 1975)"
 Memorias de humo (Quito, 1987) Las puertas de la hierba (Quito, 1994) Solo una vez la vida (Quito, 2000) La oculta candela (Quito, 2005) Poesía Junta (Quito, 2005)Tales:

 Los pasos amarillos (Quito, 1970)Essay:

 La lírica ecuatoriana (Guayaquil, 1973)Anthologies:

 Lírica ecuatoriana contemporánea (Bogotá, 1979) Diez escritoras ecuatorianas y sus cuentos (Guayaquil, 1982) Poesía viva del Ecuador (Quito, 1990) Between the Silence of Voices: An Anthology of Contemporary Ecuadorean Women Poets (Quito, 1997) Antología de narradoras ecuatorianas (Quito, 1997) Poesía erótica de mujeres: Antología del Ecuador (Quito, 2001)''

References and poems

1943 births
Living people
Ecuadorian women poets
Ecuadorian women essayists
Ecuadorian literary critics
Women literary critics
Ecuadorian essayists
20th-century Ecuadorian women writers
20th-century Ecuadorian poets
People from Guayaquil
20th-century essayists
21st-century Ecuadorian poets
21st-century Ecuadorian women writers